Jangy-Alysh (also Atayke) is a village in the Kemin District of Chüy Region of Kyrgyzstan. Its population was 2,768 in 2021. It is the center of Jangy-Alysh rural community (ayyl aymagy).

Famous people born in Jangy-Alysh
 Jumabek Ibraimov (1944 - 1999), 5th Prime Minister of Kyrgyzstan 
 Toktobolot Abdumomunov (1922 - 1989), Kyrgyz and Soviet writer

References

Populated places in Chüy Region